The Transport Protocol Experts Group (TPEG) is a data protocol suite for traffic and travel related information. TPEG can be carried over different transmission media (bearers), such as digital broadcast or cellular networks (wireless Internet). TPEG applications include, among others, information on road conditions, weather, fuel prices, parking or delays of public transport.

Overview 
TPEG is a set of data protocols for carrying traffic & travel related information, comprising a range of different applications as well as basic building blocks to manage the transmission of the applications themselves, such as the handling of different messages belonging to a given application, grouping applications into data frames, or the updating and cancellation of messages. TPEG can be carried over different transmission media (bearers), such as digital broadcast or cellular networks (wireless Internet). TPEG applications include, among others, information on road conditions, weather, fuel prices, parking or delays of public transport.

History
The Transport Protocol Experts Group was started in 1997 by the European Broadcasting Union (EBU). Work carried on under the auspices of the EBU until 2007, when the group merged with another group working on the Traffic Message Channel (TMC) protocol, hosted by ERTICO - ITS Europe and with the Mobile.Info project, where first prototypes of TPEG technology was tested under realistic driving conditions in various in-car navigation systems by a number of car manufacturers and their suppliers. Today, development work is carried out by the Traveller Information Services Association (TISA), who now also looks after the Alert-C standards used for implementing RDS-TMC services.

In the early days of the Transport Protocol Experts Group, the plan was to develop applications that could extend traffic information services far beyond existing technologies, such as RDS-TMC or proprietary protocols. Further, TPEG should include multi-modal traveller information services, facilitating roaming of travellers between different modes of transportation, e.g. between individual transportation (using a car) and public transportation (bus, subway, trains, ...). It all started with a Road Traffic Message (RTM) application, which was soon complemented by a Public Transport Information (PTI) application, which both shared a common native TPEG Location Referencing method.

TPEG RTM was intended as the "one size fits all" application. However, early implementations soon showed that the RTM structure was too broad to be used in navigation systems as a replacement for TMC. This first generation TPEG applications (TPEG generation 1, or TPEG1) also provided only a binary encoding, having in some cases a separate specification for the mapping to an XML encoding. Consequently, a revision of both the general information modelling style and the design approach was done, moving TPEG towards more clearly defined and separated applications for specific use cases and a top-down data modelling approach. This second generation TPEG applications (TPEG generation 2, or TPEG2) is now specified with an UML model, from which automatically both a binary encoding and XML encoding are derived. A TPEG2 application specification includes both the binary and XML encodings as integral part of the specification.

With the first TPEG2 TEC application, a breakthrough was achieved in a sense that both service providers and device manufacturers accepted TPEG2 as THE successor to TMC and deployments were rolled out in many countries.

Both TPEG1 and TPEG2 are standardized with the International Organization for Standardization as ISO/TS 18234 (TPEG1) and ISO/TS 21219 (TPEG2). TPEG1 is now considered a legacy system and the implementation of new services based on TPEG1 is discouraged.

Technology 
TPEG defines specifications for providing highly accurate traffic- and traveller information of many kinds. TPEG allows the transfer of data via different bearers e.g. digital broadcast or internet. In fact, today this is mainly used to inform travellers on roads, train tracks or even pedestrians. Information for a convenient journey e.g. on road conditions, weather, fuel prices, parking or delays of public transport are coded in TPEG.TPEG is a protocol with containers which carry specific content, for each service on a specific content so called ‘applications’ are defined in a separate technical specification. TPEG is designed to be modern and flexible, it is even more future proof, easy to adapt towards new trends, needs and conditions. Selecting the right applications and technical implementation profile, allows provision of safety relevant information to all travellers on time, accurately and precisely. Due to this major benefit, TPEG is also welcomed by regulators and public authorities. TPEG based products are already available in several European and Asian and American markets from different suppliers. Such products range from content creation/management over encoder/decoder equipment, test equipment and receiver/navigation devices to numerous services that are online worldwide. Further, encryption solutions are available for commercial services.

TPEG design philosophy 
TPEG is developed in a top-down fashion based on modeling use cases in the Unified Modeling Language (UML). Based on the UML modeling, two encoding versions are derived:
 Extensible Markup Language (XML) encoding – This format is human- and machine-readable and it can be easily rendered in navigation devices by parsing the XML structure. It is further backwards compatible in a way that new XML tags can be included in a given application, which would be simply skipped by older device populations that do not recognize these tags. New device populations can however benefit from the new features.
 Binary encoding – This format is not human-readable, but much more compact than its XML representation. Binary encoding is therefore frequently used when the available bandwidth is small and a compact encoding of services is of the essence.

TPEG core principles 
The following principles are considered as core in the development of the TPEG protocol, structure and semantics (see  and ).

TPEG:
 is designed for unidirectional (broadcast) and bi-directional communication channels (e.g. IP)
 binary versions are byte-oriented
 provides a protocol structure with asynchronous framing and a hierarchical data frame structure
 includes CRC error detection capabilities on different protocol levels
 assumes that the underlying communication layers provide error correction
 uses a transparent data channel
 facilitates transmission of service provider names, service names, network information, etc.
 permits the use of encryption mechanisms, e.g. for restricting access to commercial services

TPEG additional capabilities

TPEG:
 supports dynamic ("on-the-fly") location referencing methods and therefore does not need a preloaded location database (e.g. TMC Location Tables)
 offers rich content encoding
 is language independent
 facilitates client device filtering of service content
 is designed to support "thick" and "thin" client devices
 provides adaptation layers for different communication bearers

TPEG2 applications

TPEG services worldwide

Broadcast services

Mobile broadband (IP based) services

Hybrid services

See also 
 Transport standards organisations
 Traveller Information Services Association (TISA)

References

External links 
 Traveller Information Services Association (TISA)
Institut für Rundfunktechnik (IRT)
BEST Consortium
World DAB Forum
WeCanTPEG.com

Broadcasting
Travel technology
Update Tomtom